Joaquín Pujol (born 21 May 1946) is a Spanish former butterfly swimmer. He competed in two events at the 1964 Summer Olympics.

References

External links
 

1946 births
Living people
Spanish male butterfly swimmers
Olympic swimmers of Spain
Swimmers at the 1964 Summer Olympics
Place of birth missing (living people)
Swimmers at the 1963 Mediterranean Games